McCray School is a historic one-room school building for African-American students located near Burlington, Alamance County, North Carolina, United States. It was built in 1915–1916, and is a one-story, two-bay, frame building.  It has a tin gable-front roof and is sheathed in plain weatherboard. The school continued in operation until the consolidation of four rural Alamance County schoolhouses in 1951.

It was added to the National Register of Historic Places in 1986.

References

One-room schoolhouses in North Carolina
African-American history of North Carolina
School buildings on the National Register of Historic Places in North Carolina
School buildings completed in 1916
Schools in Alamance County, North Carolina
National Register of Historic Places in Alamance County, North Carolina
1916 establishments in North Carolina